Madharpakkam ( மாதர் பாக்கம்) is a village in the Tiruvallur district of Tamil Nadu, India. Part of it is located in the Gummidipoondi taluk. This village is located near Andhra Pradesh border. The villagers main source of employment depends on Gummidipoondi sipcot. This village consists of four panchayats namely Madharpakkam, Padirivedu, Manellore and Nemallur. The Government higher secondary school is one of the oldest school in the district. Telugu and Tamil are major languages spoken by people.

Demographics 

According to the 2011 census of India, Madaharpakkam has 1171 households. The effective literacy rate (i.e. the literacy rate of population excluding children aged 6 and below) is 79.17%.

References 

Villages in Gummidipoondi taluk